Harbinson is a surname. Notable people with the surname include:

 Kenneth Harbinson (1906–2000), Irish-born English cricketer
 Lenny Harbinson, Irish Gaelic footballer and manager
 Merv Harbinson (born 1959), Australian rules footballer
 W. A. Harbinson (born 1941), Northern Ireland author